The John Nicholls Medal (formerly the Robert Reynolds Trophy from 1934 to 2003) is an Australian rules football award given to the player(s) adjudged best and fairest for the Carlton Football Club for the season. The voting system as of the 2017 AFL season, consists of four coaches giving each player a ranking from one to four after each match. Players can receive a maximum of 16 votes for a game.

John Nicholls was a champion ruckman who won the award five times from 1959 to 1967.

Recipients

Multiple winners

See also

 Carlton best and fairest (list of Carlton Football Club best and fairest winners in the AFL Women's)

References
General

Specific

Australian Football League awards
Carlton Football Club
Australian rules football-related lists